Mr. Monk in Outer Space is the fifth novel in the Monk mystery novel series by writer Lee Goldberg, published on October 30, 2007. In the novel, Conrad Stipe, creator of the popular science fiction TV series Beyond Earth, is gunned down outside a Beyond Earth convention. Monk and Natalie are called in, and Monk learns that his brother Ambrose is a big expert on the show, causing a feud between the brothers.

Plot summary

Brandon Lorber, CEO of Burgerville, a national fast-food chain, is found in his office, shot three times à la the Mozambique Drill. Natalie Teeger and Adrian Monk respond to the call. Captain Stottlemeyer introduces them to an old friend, ex-policeman Archie Applebaum, who now works as a security guard, and who found the body. Lieutenant Disher tells them that the M.O. indicates a professional killer. As Archie said he never heard anything, the killer probably used a silencer. The killer obscured his face while on security cameras.

Monk concludes Brandon Lorber died of a heart attack, since Lorber's shirt is wrinkled from grabbing at his chest. There would have been more blood present if his heart was still functioning when he was shot. Since it's not a homicide, Stottlemeyer appoints Disher head of a "Special Desecration Unit" to take over the case.

Natalie stays with his brother Ambrose because he is having his carpet replaced. The next morning, Monk and Natalie arrive at a crime scene outside the San Francisco Airporter Motor Inn. Conrad Stipe, creator of the cult science fiction TV series Beyond Earth, was shot and killed climbing out of a taxi while arriving at a Beyond Earth convention. Surveillance cameras around the parking lot have caught the shooter, dressed as Mr. Snork, one of the protagonists of the show.

Investigating the convention, Adrian is appalled at the complexity of Beyond Earths premise, the devotion to the show shown by the "Earthers" (fans), and the discovery that Ambrose has authored several Earther books. He learns that a revamped Beyond Earth is being created, suggesting that Stipe was killed by a disgruntled fan for allowing a less-than-faithful adaptation of the show.

Monk and Natalie interview Kingston Mills, the executive producer of the new Beyond Earth. Natalie suggests Mills could have killed Stipe to get his cut from the show's profits, but Mills reveals that Stipe had a pay-or-play contract, so Stipe's share goes to his estate, not Mills. Arianna Stipe, Conrad Stipe's ex-wife, is suing the estate for half of the profits from the new show, and has taken her divorce lawyer Howard Egger as her lover, but she was on a plane when Conrad was killed.

Examining the surveillance video, Ambrose notices that the uniform the killer is wearing is from the Beyond Earth pilot, but the ears are from season two. Ambrose believes an Earther would never wear a costume with such inaccuracies. He also notices that the uniform is brand-new, which means it must have been purchased from Ursula Glemstadt, the only Earther who makes uniforms with the design from the pilot, at the convention. Adrian scornfully dismisses these facts as insignificant. Natalie is appalled, since Adrian normally solves cases based on such small details.

Stottlemeyer and Disher examine Phil Bisson, a cab driver who was shot and killed at around 1:00 AM. It is believed that Bisson was flagged down by a gunman, who forced him out of his cab at gunpoint, led him to a deserted lot, shot him, took his money, and fled. But Monk is convinced the scene was staged: Bisson never told his dispatcher that he was picking someone up, and the cab appears to have made a U-turn to face the street. None of the residents nearby heard a gunshot, indicating that the killer used a silencer, which is not normally employed in petty robbery. Examining the cab's interior, Monk concludes from a piece of gum in the backseat which matches one in the cab Stipe took and a candy wrapper that came from a bowl of coffee candies in Lorber's office that the same man who killed the cabbie desecrated Brandon Lorber and killed Stipe.

Monk determines a shredded document found on Lorber's desk was planted; the document had a regular paper clip, but Lorber had a color-coded system of organizing files. It also is badly streaked, meaning it was shredded and then put back together. They talk to the forensics accountant, who tells them about Burgerville's financial irregularities and reveals that the company is on the verge of collapse from a series of scandals. Monk says he has solved the case: Someone hired a hit man to kill Lorber, but when the hit man arrived, Lorber was dead. The hit man shot Lorber's body to make it look like he did his job, so he could collect his fee. The hit man caught a taxi to the airport. After Phil Bisson dropped the assassin off, he picked up Conrad Stipe. The hit man left something incriminating in the cab, and had to kill both Stipe and the cabbie because they would have figured out what the object meant. He used a Mr. Snork costume while killing Stipe, making sure to be seen on security cameras, so that police would focus suspicions on the Earthers.

Monk and Natalie head to Burgerville's building to question Andrew Cahill, the company's CFO and acting CEO. He admits that he has been cooperating with a Justice Department investigation into Burgerville's financial practices, and has been granted immunity from prosecution while testifying about the financial misdeeds Lorber committed. When asked if Lorber had any enemies, Cahill tells them to check out Lorber's wife Veronica. Monk tests a shredder in Lorber's office, and determines that the shredded document found on Lorber's desk came from Cahill's shredder, indicating that Cahill is lying and also is part of the embezzlement scheme.

When Monk and Natalie talk to Veronica Lorber, who contradicts Cahill, and says that Lorber was not involved with the financial scandal and Cahill was responsible. Monk suspects Cahill and Veronica are secret lovers.

The next morning, Monk and Natalie head back to the San Francisco Airport, where Kingston Mills has been killed. Mills arrived at the convention in his chauffeured car, and a gunman dressed as Mr. Snork shot him in the shoulder. Mills ran, but the shooter shot him in the leg, then stepped up to him and shot him in the back. Despite obvious differences in the m.o. (Mills was shot three times instead of once), Stottlemeyer insists that both shootings are connected, as this shooter wore a Mr. Snork costume.

Watching footage of the shooting, Ambrose notes that this shooter has a Mr. Snork uniform which is accurate in every detail, carried his handgun like a Beyond Earth weapon and not like an ordinary handgun, and is speaking a fictional Beyond Earth language called Dratch. Adrian congratulates Ambrose for revealing the killer to be Ernest Pinchuk, the leader of the "Galactic Uprising," a fan group protesting the new Beyond Earth show.

As Pinchuk is interrogated, Monk continues to insist that Pinchuk did not kill Stipe, since he would never wear an inaccurate Beyond Earth uniform. Stottlemeyer is not convinced. Monk and Natalie return to Burgerville headquarters and inform Archie Applebaum that Lorber had a heart attack before he was shot. Monk believes Archie discovered that Lorber had pillaged the company's pension plan and wanted to exact revenge. He says all the evidence points to an inside man, but does not explain why he rules out Cahill or Veronica, who Natalie notes were also on the inside. By informing Archie of Lorber's heart attack, he is tricking Archie into calling the hit man for a meeting to demand his money back. Monk and Natalie enter the building to photograph the meeting, but accidentally lock themselves in. There is also no meeting to photograph, as the hit man immediately shoots Archie, then comes for Monk and Natalie after they shout a warning to Archie on the P.A. system. Monk tells Natalie to run while he stalls the hit man. Natalie runs outside, gets in her car, and crashes it into the building just as Archie (who was wearing a bulletproof vest) shoots the hit man.

Stottlemeyer and Disher talk to Archie, learning his reasons for hiring the hit man: he had never given up being a cop, and late at night, he often searched his employees' offices and desks. He discovered the report and realized that Lorber had pillaged the pension fund, and knowing that Lorber was not likely to get hard time, had to do something about it.

Monk gets the hit man to tell him what it was he dropped in the cab: his BlackBerry, which had emails between him and Archie, photos of Lorber, and a diagram of the building. After he killed Stipe, the hit man arranged to have the cabbie deliver the phone to him.

Allusions to real-life events, places, or people
Whether unintentional or not, the Burgerville corporation shown in the novel is not to be confused with the fast food chain of the same name in the Vancouver, Washington metro area.
The forensics accountant describes the Burgerville financial scandal as being a repeat of the Enron scandal from 2000 to 2005.
Besides being a Star Trek parody, Beyond Earth also borrows from Battlestar Galactica, following a fleeing convoy of survivors of an interplanetary genocide who nonetheless have time for campy adventures. The controversy caused by Beyond Earths darker modern day reboot is also a reference to Battlestar Galactica. The show is also mentioned as having a rival fanbase with Beyond Earth.
Kingston Mills mentions Showtime's "shows about the dope-dealing mother, the Vancouver lesbians, the bigamist, and the cop who is a serial killer." He is referring to Weeds, The L Word, Californication, and Dexter, respectively. All four were on the air at the time Mr. Monk in Outer Space was published.

To McDonald's
When discussing possible motives with Monk, Natalie and Stottlemeyer, Randy mentions how Burgerville secretly added beef extract to add flavor to their fries, outraging vegans who had been eating these fries. In 2000, McDonald's came under fire from consumers after it was revealed that their fries that supposedly had no meat products in them had been flavored with beef extract. See McDonald's legal cases.
In the same conversation, Randy brings up an incident at a Burgerville in Pleasanton, California, where a guy spilled a cup of coffee at a drive-thru and burned his crotch, and sued the company. This appears to be a take on Liebeck v. McDonald's Restaurants, aka the "Hot Coffee Case", in which a woman spilled her cup of coffee while in her car and suffered third-degree burns to her crotch.

To Star Trek
Beyond Earth is largely a parody of Star Trek.
One of the panels listed in the Beyond Earth convention guide is "When Will Trekkers Give Earthers the Respect we Deserve?".
The fictional Beyond Earth character Mr. Snork appears to be an oblique parody of Star Trek character Mr. Spock. 
The name of Mr. Snork's species and language, "Dratch," is taken from Monk series writer and producer Daniel Dratch, but the language's creation and use by Pinchuk is a reference to the Klingon constructed language.
Conrad Stipe's ex-wife Arianna is suing her dead husband's estate for a share of his profits from the new Beyond Earth series, even though it is being produced after they divorced. Similarly, Eileen Roddenberry, the first wife of Star Trek creator Gene Roddenberry, sued her ex-husband's estate after his death, claiming rights to a share of his profits from the making of the original Star Trek series and the subsequent spin-off series and films.
Stottlemeyer says "Beam me up, Scotty," when he notices the gun in Ernie Pinchuk's house, the interior of which has been designed to look like the U.S.S. Discovery, from Beyond Earth. The Discovery is an equivalent to the U.S.S. Enterprise.

Continuity nod
Several references are made to the events of this story in later novels. In Mr. Monk Gets Even, it is noted that computer magnate Cleve Dobbs lives a few doors down from the Lorbers' house. It is also noted that Dobbs's first murder victim, Bruce Grossman, was a CEO-for-hire who took over and briefly ran Burgerville in the wake of the Brandon Lorber investigation.

Characters

Characters from the television show
Adrian Monk: the titular detective
Ambrose Monk: Adrian's elder brother, an agoraphobe who never leaves his and Adrian's childhood home, and a devoted Beyond Earth fan
Natalie Teeger: Monk's loyal assistant, and the narrator of the book
Dr. Charles Kroger: Monk's psychiatrist
Captain Leland Stottlemeyer: Captain of the San Francisco Police Department's Homicide Division; Monk's oldest friend and former partner
Lieutenant Randy Disher: Stottlemeyer's right-hand man
Julie Teeger: Natalie's teenaged daughter

Original characters

Characters associated with Beyond Earth
 Conrad Stipe: Creator of the original version of Beyond Earth
 Morris Hibler: Organizer of the Beyond Earth conventions
 Willis Goldkin: One of the writers for the original Beyond Earth TV series
 Ernest "Ernie" Pinchuk: leader of the "Galactic Uprising" protesting the revamp of Beyond Earth
 Aimee Gilberman: Ernie Pinchuk's girlfriend, a devoted Beyond Earth fan and co-leader of the Uprising
 Kingston Mills: producer of the new Beyond Earth
 Judson Beck: actor, cast for the lead role in the new Beyond Earth show
 Arianna Stipe: Conrad Stipe's ex-wife
 Howard Egger: Arianna's divorce lawyer and secret lover
 Hidalgo Rhinehart: A police detective with the Berkeley Police Department

Characters associated with Burgerville
 Archie Applebaum: a former beat cop and friend of Stottlemeyer, currently a security guard at Burgerville's head office
 Brandon Lorber: CEO of Burgerville
 Lieutenant Sylvia Chase: head of the San Francisco Police Department's Forensic Accounting Unit
 Andrew Cahill: Burgerville's CFO
 Veronica Lorber: Brandon Lorber's wife and Andrew Cahill's secret mistress
 Maxwell: Lorber's assistant and butler

Other characters
 Phil Bisson: ill-fated cab driver; driver of both Lorber's shooter and Conrad Stipe
 Joe Cochran: Natalie's sometime-lover, a firefighter with the San Francisco Fire Department. Previously appeared in Mr. Monk Goes to the Firehouse and Mr. Monk and the Two Assistants.

Footnotes

External links
Official Monk Site

2007 American novels
Monk (novel series)
Signet Books books